The following is a list of Texas state agencies.

List of agencies
Angelina and Neches River Authority
Brazos River Authority
Canadian River Municipal Water Authority
Cancer Prevention and Research Institute of Texas
Edwards Aquifer Authority
Employees Retirement System of Texas
 Executive Council of Physical Therapy and Occupational Therapy Examiners of Texas
Guadalupe-Blanco River Authority
Lower Colorado River Authority
Office of the Governor of Texas
Office of the Lieutenant Governor of Texas
Office of the Public Utility Counsel of Texas
Office of the State Prosecuting Attorney
Public Utility Commission of Texas
Railroad Commission of Texas
Red River Authority
Sabine River Authority (Texas)
State Bar of Texas
Teacher Retirement System of Texas
Texas A&M AgriLife Research
Texas A&M AgriLife Extension Service
Texas A&M University System
Texas Alcoholic Beverage Commission
Texas Animal Health Commission
Texas Apiary Inspection Service
Texas Appraiser Licensing and Certification Board
Texas Attorney General
Texas Board of Architectural Examiners
Texas Board of Chiropractic Examiners
Texas Board of Nursing
Texas Board of Pardons and Paroles
Texas Board of Pharmacy
Texas Board of Plumbing Examiners
Texas Board of Podiatric Medical Examiners
Texas Board of Professional Engineers and Land Surveyors
Texas Board of Professional Geoscientists
Texas Bond Review Board
Texas Commission of State Emergency Communications
Texas Commission on Environmental Quality
Texas Commission on Fire Protection
Texas Commission on Jail Standards
Texas Commission on Judicial Conduct
Texas Commission on Law Enforcement Officer Standards and Education
Texas Commission on the Arts
Texas Comptroller of Public Accounts
Texas Council for Developmental Disabilities
Texas Council on Competitive Government
Texas County and District Retirement System
Texas Court of Appeals
Texas Court of Criminal Appeals
Texas Credit Union Department
Texas Department of Agriculture
 Texas Department of Banking
Texas Department of Criminal Justice
Texas Department of Family and Protective Services
Texas Department of Housing and Community Affairs
Texas Department of Information Resources
Texas Department of Insurance
Texas Department of Licensing and Regulation
Texas Department of Public Safety
Texas Department of Savings and Mortgage Lending
Texas Department of State Health Services
Texas Department of Transportation
Texas Education Agency
Texas Engineering Experiment Station
Texas Engineering Extension Service
Texas Ethics Commission
Texas Facilities Commission
Texas Film Commission
 Texas Finance Commission
Texas Forest Service
 Texas Funeral Service Commission
Texas General Land Office
Texas Health and Human Services Commission
Texas Higher Education Coordinating Board
Texas Historical Commission
Texas Juvenile Justice Department
Texas Legislative Budget Board
Texas Legislative Council
Texas Legislative Reference Library
Texas Lottery Commission
Texas Medical Board
Texas Military Department
Texas Music Office
Texas Office of Consumer Credit Commissioner
Texas Office of Court Administration
Texas Office of Public Insurance Counsel
Texas Office of State-Federal Relations
Texas Optometry Board
Texas Parks and Wildlife Department
Texas Pension Review Board
Texas Public Finance Authority
Texas Racing Commission
Texas Real Estate Commission
Texas School for the Blind and Visually Impaired
Texas School for the Deaf
Texas Secretary of State
Texas Securities Board
Texas State Anatomical Board
Texas State Auditor's Office
Texas State Board of Dental Examiners
Texas State Board for Educator Certification
Texas State Board of Examiners of Psychologists
Texas State Board of Public Accountancy
Texas State Board of Veterinary Medical Examiners
Texas State Cemetery
Texas State Law Library
Texas State Library and Archives Commission
Texas State Office of Administrative Hearings
Texas State Office of Risk Management
Texas State Preservation Board
Texas State Soil and Water Conservation Board
Texas State Technical College System 
Texas State University System
Texas Sunset Advisory Commission
Texas Tech University System
Texas Veterans Commission
Texas Veterans Land Board
Texas Water Development Board
Texas Wildlife Services
Texas Workforce Commission
Trinity River Authority
University of Houston System
University of North Texas System
University of Texas System

External links
Texas State Library and Archives Commission — List of Texas State Agencies

 
Texas
agencies